Pachygnatha clercki is a species of long-jawed orb weaver in the family of spiders known as Tetragnathidae. It is found in North America, Europe, Caucasus, Russia, Central Asia, China, Korea, and Japan.

References

External links

 

Tetragnathidae
Articles created by Qbugbot
Spiders described in 1823